Sailors' Home Sydney is a building once used by seaman and later as a prison in Sydney, Australia. Sailors used the home until 1980, but the building now houses a restaurant.

The building's 150th anniversary is to be celebrated by the committee established to build and operate the home in Sydney.

History 
In 1859, a provisional committee of citizens was formed with the object of building a Sailors’ Home in Sydney to provide them with comfortable accommodation while the seamen were on shore.

In 1860, land in George Street North in the Rocks area of Sydney was designated as a suitable site and construction began in 1863, using a design similar to sailors’ homes in other seaports. Construction continued from 1864 to 1926. The original name for Sailors home is Seamen's Mission, but it changed to avoid the pun.

The Home opened its doors in February 1865. Naval personnel lodged there until 1891 when the Royal Naval House, with accommodation for 300, opened in nearby Grosvenor Street.

The sailors used to consume opium and alcohol, because in the nineteenth century, opium is legally consumed. Passersby could smell opium when near the Sailor's home.

In 2002, Sailors Home was changed to The Australian Mariners’ Welfare Society.

References

External links

Buildings and structures in Sydney